Karacho (German for 'high speed') is a Gerstlauer steel roller coaster at Erlebnispark Tripsdrill, Germany designed by Imaginvest. It opened on 10 July 2013.

The ride was Gerstlauer's 50th roller coaster, with Erlebnispark Tripsdrill also being the park where the company installed their first roller coaster.

References

External links
 Pictures and press conference of Karacho (German)

Roller coasters in Germany